Ab Sarduiyeh may refer to:
 Ab Sarduiyeh, Anbarabad
 Ab Sarduiyeh, Rudbar-e Jonubi